The Psychumentary is a documentary film about rapper Tech N9ne. It charted at number seven on the Billboard Top Music Videos chart. It was directed by Soren Baker and Steven Reissner, Baker also served as writer and producer. The film includes appearances by Kottonmouth Kings and fellow Strange Music artists Krizz Kaliko, Kutt Calhoun, Skatterman & Snug Brim and Prozak. Other commentators on the DVD include Tech N9ne's ex-wife, mother of his two daughters, and Strange Music President Travis O'Guin.

References

External links
 

2008 films
2008 documentary films
Documentary films about hip hop music and musicians